The 1969–70 ABA season was the Rockets' third season. They ended up with a 51-33 record. Out of the 11 teams that played in the ABA that season the Rockets had the highest rating in simple rating system and offensive rating. This was their first playoff series win. They would not win another playoff series until 1975.

Roster

Season standings

Eastern Division

Western Division

Asterisk Denotes playoff team

Game log
 1969-70 Denver Rockets Schedule and Results | Basketball-Reference.com

Statistics

Playoffs
Western Division Semifinals vs. Washington Capitals

Rockets win series, 4–3

Division Finals

Rockets lose series, 4–1

Awards and records
 ABA All-Star: Larry Jones, Spencer Haywood
 ABA All-Star Game Most Valuable Player: Spencer Haywood
 ABA Most Valuable Player: Spencer Haywood
 ABA Coach of the Year Award: Joe Belmont
 ABA All-League Team: Spencer Haywood, Larry Jones

Transactions

References

Denver Nuggets seasons
Denver
Denver Nuggets
Denver Nuggets